Hymenobacter aquatilis is a Gram-negative, aerobic and non-motile bacterium from the genus of Hymenobacter which has been isolated from water from a mesotrophic artificial lake in Korea.

References 

aquatilis
Bacteria described in 2018